Capsicophysalis is a genus of flowering plants belonging to the family Solanaceae.

Its native range is Guatemala, Mexico.

Species:
 Capsicophysalis potosina (B.L.Rob. & Greenm.) Averett & M.Martínez

References

Solanaceae
Solanaceae genera